James Buchanan House may refer to:

James Buchanan House (Nashville, Tennessee), listed on the National Register of Historic Places in Davidson County, Tennessee
Wheatland (James Buchanan House), former residence of President James Buchanan outside of Lancaster, Pennsylvania

See also
Buchanan House (disambiguation)